Alajõe (Oleshnitsa) is a village in Ida-Viru County, in northeastern Estonia. It is located on the northern shore of Lake Peipus. Alajõe is the administrative centre of Alutaguse Parish. In 2000 the village had a population of 147.

Alajõe was first mentioned in 1583.

Gallery

References

Villages in Ida-Viru County